Alexander Zverev was the defending champion and successfully defended his title, defeating Alex de Minaur in the final, 6–2, 6–4.

Seeds
All seeds receive byes into the second round.

Draw

Finals

Top half

Section 1

Section 2

Bottom half

Section 3

Section 4

Qualifying

Seeds
The top four seeds receive byes into the qualifying competition.

Qualifiers

Lucky loser
  Jason Kubler

Qualifying draw

First qualifier

Second qualifier

Third qualifier

Fourth qualifier

Fifth qualifier

Sixth qualifier

References
Main draw
Qualifying draw

2018 ATP World Tour